Cam Ranh is a city in southern Khánh Hòa Province, in the South Central Coast region of Vietnam.

Geography
It is the second-largest city in the province, after Nha Trang. It is located on Cam Ranh Bay. As of 2009 the city had a population of 121,050 and covered an area of 316 km².

Infrastructure
Cam Ranh International Airport
Ba Ngòi Port

Climate
Cam Ranh has a tropical savanna climate (Köppen climate classification: As).

References

External links 

 
Populated places in Khánh Hòa province
Districts of Khánh Hòa province
Cities in Vietnam